John Francis Morley (6 October 1942 – 7 July 1980) was an Irish Gaelic footballer and Garda Síochána. His championship career at senior level with the Mayo county team spanned thirteen seasons from 1961 until 1974. Morley is widely regarded as one of Mayo's greatest ever players.

Born in Kiltimagh, County Mayo, Morley was educated locally and later attended St Jarlath's College in Tuam where he first played competitive football. Here he won back-to-back All-Ireland medals in 1960 and 1961.

At club level Morley first played at juvenile and underage levels with Kiltimagh before later lining out with a variety of clubs. His greatest success was with the Ballaghaderreen club with whom he won a county senior championship medal in 1972.

Morley made his debut on the inter-county scene at the age of seventeen when he was selected for the Mayo minor team in 1960. He enjoyed one championship season with the minor team which ended without success. He subsequently joined the Mayo senior team, making his debut during the 1961-62 league. Over the course of the next thirteen seasons, Morley enjoyed much success, winning Connacht medals in 1967 and 1969 and a National League medal in 1970. He played his last game for Mayo in June 1974.

After being chosen on the Connacht inter-provincial team for the first time in 1962, Morley was an automatic choice on the starting fifteen for almost a decade. During that time he won Railway Cup medals in 1967 and 1969.

Morley, who rose to the rank of detective in the Garda Síochána, was murdered on 7 July 1980 by alleged members of the Irish National Liberation Army (INLA) during a pursuit in the aftermath of a bank robbery near Loughglynn, County Roscommon. Morley's colleague, Henry Byrne, was also killed in the pursuit. The officers' deaths provoked national outrage. Three men were apprehended, convicted and sentenced to death for capital murder. Two of the sentences were later reduced to 40 years imprisonment while the third was overturned.

Career statistics

Honours
St Jarlath's College
All-Ireland Colleges Senior Football Championship (2): 1960, 1961
Connacht Colleges Senior Football Championship (2): 1960, 1961

Ballaghaderreen
Mayo Senior Football Championship (1): 1972
Mayo Intermediate Football Championship (1): 1971 (c)

Mayo
Connacht Senior Football Championship (2): 1967, 1969
National Football League (1): 1969-70

Connacht
Railway Cup (2): 1967, 1969

See also
 Murder of Henry Byrne and John Morley

References

1942 births
1980 deaths
Ballaghaderreen Gaelic footballers
Connacht inter-provincial Gaelic footballers
Garda Síochána officers
Kiltimagh Gaelic footballers
Male murder victims
Mayo inter-county Gaelic footballers
People educated at St Jarlath's College